The 2021 Charlottesville Men's Pro Challenger was a professional tennis tournament played on indoor hard courts. It was the twelfth edition of the tournament which was part of the 2021 ATP Challenger Tour, taking place in Charlottesville, United States from November 1 to 7, 2021.

Singles main-draw entrants

Seeds

 1 Rankings are as of 25 October 2021.

Other entrants
The following players received wildcards into the singles main draw:
  Martin Damm
  Emilio Nava
  Jeffrey von der Schulenburg

The following player received entry into the singles main draw using a protected ranking:
  Peter Polansky

The following players received entry into the singles main draw as alternates:
  Stefan Kozlov
  Go Soeda
  Yosuke Watanuki
  Wu Tung-lin

The following players received entry from the qualifying draw:
  Nick Chappell
  Christian Harrison
  Denis Kudla
  Iñaki Montes de la Torre

Champions

Singles

 Stefan Kozlov def.  Aleksandar Vukic 6–2, 6–3.

Doubles

 William Blumberg /  Max Schnur def.  Treat Huey /  Frederik Nielsen 3–6, 6–1, [14–12].

References

2021 ATP Challenger Tour
2021
2021 in American tennis
2021 in sports in Virginia
November 2021 sports events in the United States